The 2007–08 Liga Alef season saw Hapoel Umm al-Fahm (champions of the North Division) and Maccabi Ironi Bat Yam (champions of the South Division) winning the title and promotion to Liga Artzit.

At the bottom, the bottom two clubs in each division, Hapoel Ahva Haifa, Hapoel Makr (from North division), Maccabi Ironi Amishav Petah Tikva and Ironi Ofakim (from South division) were all automatically relegated to Liga Bet, whilst the two clubs which were ranked in 12th place in each division, Beitar Haifa and Hapoel Tzafririm Holon entered a promotion/relegation play-offs, and both relegated to Liga Bet after losing the play-offs.

Changes from last season

Team changes
 Hapoel Bnei Jadeidi and Hapoel Kfar Shalem were promoted to Liga Artzit; Hapoel Herzliya (to North division) and Maccabi Be'er Sheva (to South division) were relegated from Liga Artzit.
 Hapoel Kafr Sumei, Maccabi Sektzia Ma'alot-Tarshiha and Hapoel Reineh were relegated to Liga Bet from North division; Beitar Ihud Mashhad, Ironi Sayid Umm al-Fahm and Ironi Tiberias were promoted to the North division from Liga Bet.
 A.S. Ramat Eliyahu and Hapoel Arad were relegated to Liga Bet from South division; Maccabi Ironi Kfar Yona and Maccabi Ironi Netivot were promoted to the South division from Liga Bet.
 During the summer break Hapoel Maxim Lod, which won the previous season South division, folded. To replace the team, Beitar Kfar Saba, as the best runner-up in the Liga Bet south divisions, was also promoted.

North Division

South Division

Relegation play-offs

North play-off
The 12th placed club in Liga Alef North, Beitar Haifa, faced Liga Bet North B runners-up, Maccabi Tamra in a two legged play-off. The Liga Bet North A runners-up, Hapoel Iksal was suspended from the play-offs, following an attempt for match fixing, prior to their scheduled match against Beitar Haifa.

Maccabi Tamra won 4-2 on aggregate and was promoted to Liga Alef.

South play-off
The 12th placed club in Liga Alef South, Hapoel Tzafririm Holon, faced the Liga Bet South A and Liga Bet South B runners-up, Hapoel Mahane Yehuda and Hapoel Arad. The teams faced each other in a round-robin tournament.

Hapoel Arad won the play-offs and was promoted to Liga Alef.

References
 The Israel Football Association 
 The Israel Football Association 
Play-offs: Hapoel Arad promoted to Liga Alef The Israel Football Association, 23.5.2008 
Play-offs: Maccabi Tamra promoted to Liga Alef North The Israel Football Association, 3.6.2008 

Liga Alef seasons
4
Israel